Yorkshire Traction was a bus operator in Yorkshire that operated from 1902 until 2005.

History

In March 1902 the Barnsley & District Electric Traction Company Limited was formed. It operated trams around the Barnsley area until around 1930. In 1928, prior to the trams being withdrawn, the company was renamed from the Barnsley & District Traction Company Limited (the 'electric' part of the name being dropped some years earlier). The company was affectionately referred to as 'Tracky'.

In October 1968, Yorkshire Traction purchased Mexborough & Swinton Traction Company and County Motors.

As part of the privatisation of the National Bus Company, Yorkshire Traction was sold in January 1987 to a management buyout. The business subsequently expanded through purchasing other operators including:
Ridings Travel
Barnsley & District formed in July 1990 when Yorkshire Traction bought the bus business of Tom Jowitt Travel, Wombwell
Lincolnshire RoadCar Company
Lincoln City Transport
Yorkshire Terrier
Andrews (merged with Yorkshire Terrier in 1998)
Sheffield Omnibus (merged with Andrews in 1996)
South Riding (merged with Andrews in 1995)
Strathtay Scottish in May 1991
Meffans Coaches (a subsidiary of Strathtay)
London Traveller 35% shareholding, sold in to Thorpes in October 2001

In December 2005, Yorkshire Traction was sold to Stagecoach Yorkshire. In May 2008, Stagecoach sold its Huddersfield operations to Centrebus Holdings, it was then subsequently passed to Arriva Yorkshire as Yorkshire Tiger, and then to Transdev Blazefield in 2021, who operate as Team Pennine. The part of the business remaining with Stagecoach was renamed Stagecoach Sheffield.

Operations
The company operated services across Barnsley, Doncaster, Rotherham and into Leeds, Huddersfield and eventually, Sheffield. From the 1974 merger of Sheffield, Rotherham and Doncaster municipal bus companies until the mid-1990s, the operating area of South Yorkshire was split between South Yorkshire Transport and Yorkshire Traction with the former dominating Sheffield and Rotherham. Through the acquisitions of Sheffield Omnibus, South Riding, Andrews and Yorkshire Terrier in the early 1990s, the company gained a significant foothold in Sheffield.

Yorkshire Traction had for decades been a major regional operator of National Express services covering nationwide routes in addition to its regular and long established services in and out of London to Yorkshire towns and cities. It had also operated alongside National Travel, the short break holiday arm of National Bus Company. Upon privatisation, YTC launched "Yorkshire Traction's Coachlink" which became a popular choice for the short break coach holidaymaker within the region. In 1989, neighbouring operator West Riding Automobile Company left the coaching industry and sold the name "Ridings Travel", the order book and the goodwill, but no vehicles, to YTC. They merged this operation into their existing coaching unit and painted several coaches in full Ridings Travel livery.

See also
List of bus operators of the United Kingdom

References

John Banks Prestige Series No.36 Yorkshire Traction 2 *Venture Publications 
John Banks Prestige Series No.5 Yorkshire Traction  Venture Publications

External links

Flickr gallery
Stagecoach Yorkshire
Companies House extract company no 02065401

1902 establishments in England
2005 disestablishments in England
Companies based in Barnsley
Former bus operators in South Yorkshire